Riverside Military Academy is a private, college preparatory, boarding and day school for boys in grades 6 through 12 in Gainesville, Georgia, United States.

History 
Riverside Military Academy was founded in 1907 by local Professors and Businessmen- Haywood Jefferson Pearce and Azor Warner Van Hoose, Jr  with the mission of preparing ethical young men for success in college and life. Riverside officially opened its doors during the Fall of 1908, but would not gain prominence until 1913 when a young Professor from Stone Mountain, GA: Professor Edgar Dunlap "Sandy" Beaver (later General)  became the Director of Riverside Military Academies' Academics and Military Department. Riverside had a Winter campus in Hollywood, Florida, which briefly was used as a Naval Air Gunners School during WWII,  from 1931 until 1984, when it was sold. The Gainesville campus underwent renovations from 1997 until 2004, adding a new barracks building, academics building, gymnasium, and a library and performing arts center.

Awards 
Riverside Military Academy won "Best Band" by virtual appearance in the Atlanta Veteran's Day Parade in 2020.

Riverside Military Academy won its 10th consecutive Atlanta Veterans Day, "Presidents' Trophy" in 2019.

The Riverside Military Academy Track & Field team was crowned 2018 GHSA state champions.

Notable alumni

 Félix Arturo González Canto, governor of the Mexican state of Quintana Roo (1987)
 James Earl Carter Sr., father of U.S. President Jimmy Carter (Attended 1911)
 Tyler Carter, former clean vocalist of the metalcore bands Woe, Is Me and Issues
 David Duke Former Republican Louisiana State Representative in District 81 and Grand Wizard of the KKK.
 CeeLo Green (Thomas DeCarlo Callaway), singer-songwriter, rapper, record producer and actor
 Bobby Greenwood, professional golfer (Attended 1957)
 Admiral David L. McDonald, U.S. Chief of Naval Operations during the Vietnam War (1924)
 Victor Miguel Pacheco Mendez, President of AraJet
 Victor Oscar Pacheco Mendez, CEO of Grupo VOPM; founder of Panacrédito
 Arturo "Chico" O'Farrill, composer, arranger, and conductor (1938)
 Offset (Kiari Kendrell Cephus), American rapper part of rapper group, Migos (Attended 2008)
 Patrick O'Neal, actor 
 George P. Oslin, inventor of the singing telegram (1913)
 Luis M. Proenza, university president (1962)
 Tommy Prothro, football coach (1938)
 Johnny Riddle, baseball player (1926)
 Red Sanders, football coach (1923)
 Everett Strupper, leading scorer in the Georgia Tech 222, Cumberland 0 football game of 1916; member of the College Football Hall of Fame (1914)
 Douglass Watson, soap opera actor (1938)

References

Military high schools in the United States
Schools in Hall County, Georgia
Private high schools in Georgia (U.S. state)
Private middle schools in Georgia (U.S. state)
Preparatory schools in Georgia (U.S. state)
1907 establishments in Georgia (U.S. state)